Maletti is a surname. Notable people with the surname include:

Fernando Carlos Maletti (born 1949), Argentine Roman Catholic bishop
Pietro Maletti (1880–1940), Italian General 
Pierre François Maletti (1564–1631)

See also 
Maletti Group, an ad hoc mechanised unit formed by the Italian Royal Army